2:22 A Ghost Story is a thriller play by Danny Robins. It premiered in the West End in 2021, and received a Laurence Olivier Award nomination for Best New Play the following year.

Production history

West End (2021-23) 
On 10 June 2021, it was announced that the play would premiere at the Noël Coward Theatre in London's West End from 3 August running until 16 October 2021. The production was directed by Matthew Dunster, designed by Anna Fleischle, and starred Lily Allen as Jenny, Julia Chan as Lauren, Hadley Fraser as Sam, and Jake Wood as Ben.

The premiere production was nominated for three Laurence Olivier Awards in 2022, including Best New Play and Best Actress for Allen. The show was also nominated for four WhatsOnStage Awards, and won Best New Play, Best Actress for Allen and Best Supporting Actor for Wood.

Following the successful run at the Noël Coward, it was announced the play would transfer to the Gielgud Theatre, running from 4 December 2021 to 12 February 2022. A new cast was announced including Stephanie Beatriz as Lauren, James Buckley as Ben, Elliot Cowan as Sam, and Giovanna Fletcher as Jenny.

A third West End engagement at the Criterion Theatre, from 10 May to 4 September 2022, was announced without a casting confirmation. On 29 March 2022, the new cast was announced, starring Tom Felton as Sam, Mandip Gill as Jenny, Beatriz Romilly as Lauren and Sam Swainsbury as Ben. On 11 August 2022, an extension of the engagement at the Criterion was announced starring Laura Whitmore as Jenny, Felix Scott as Sam, Matt Willis as Ben and Tamsin Carroll as Lauren, running from 6 September to 8 January 2023.

On 7 December 2022, the cast for its fourth West End engagement was announced. Cheryl, Hugo Chegwin, Louise Ford and Scott Karim will be playing at the Lyric Theatre, London from 21 January 2023 to 23 April 2023. On January 24, 2023, it was announced that Hugo Chegwin was forced to withdraw from the show due to having flu during the rehearsal period. Understudy Ben Cutler performed the role for the first four shows before Jake Wood reprised his role as Ben from January 26-April 23, 2023.

Los Angeles (2022) 
The play made its U.S. premiere with a run at the Ahmanson Theatre, Los Angeles from October 29 to December 4, 2022. This production would star Constance Wu as Jenny, Anna Camp as Lauren, Adam Rothenberg as Sam, Finn Wittrock as Ben, and recast the setting to Boston.

UK tour (2023-24) 
On 10 February 2023, it was announced that the play will embark on a UK tour starting at the Theatre Royal, Bath on 1 September with dates until May 2024. Casting is to be announced.

Plot
Jenny and her husband Sam have recently bought a large house in Greater London that they are renovating. For several nights, at exactly 2:22 am, Jenny hears the sound of someone moving around the house, often via the baby monitor in her daughter's bedroom, and becomes convinced the house is haunted. Sam, being a cynic and having been away on a work trip, insists there are more logical explanations for the noises. The couple hosts a dinner party for Lauren, an old university friend of Sam's, and Ben, her new boyfriend who has a belief in the supernatural. After discussing the strange noises, Jenny persuades the others to stay up until 2:22am to see what happens.

Cast and characters

Critical reception
In The Guardian, Kate Wyver wrote, "With a brilliant sense of mounting dread and just the right number of jump-scares, Danny Robins' new ghost story is a slick, chilling romp of a play", adding, "You wouldn't know this is Allen's first time acting in the West End. She is strong as the frantic, afraid and exhausted Jen [...] though it's in her moments of stillness that the fear best finds its way in". She described the cast as "gleaming", noting "Fraser's Sam is so realistic it's hard to believe he's acting", that Wood "revels in [his role of Ben], drawing out the humour and diving into the mysticism", and that "Chan does a brilliant balancing act, shifting Lauren's loyalties throughout the night". Wyver praised Robins' script, finding it "sharp, quick, and cleverly layered with clues. While his handling of horror is nothing new, it's done smartly, toying with the tropes. In one of the most chilling scenes, absolutely nothing happens yet the grand old room is electric with the fear of expectation". She was less impressed with "an overuse of deafening fox screams" and found that "arguments occasionally escalate into one-note yelling" but judged that "neither of these things do much to detract from the steadily growing tension". Overall, she decided, "This show is not scary enough to cause nightmares, nor is it gruesome or graphic or gory; it's more human than the creepiest horror movies. But there are genuinely chilling moments, scary enough that the whole theatre is tense and pin-drop quiet. [...] Scary enough, perhaps, to have you turn on the light the next time you hear an unusual sound at night, just to check the time".

Reviewing the play for The Independent, Annabel Nugent wrote, "Allen is superb as Jenny. Exhaustion thrums a fraction below her palpable fear – just visible enough in her performance to have you questioning Jenny's version of events. And while it may be Allen who everyone has come to see, she isn't bearing the weight alone", adding, "Fraser embodies the role of his condescending character so fully that you come away hating him just a little", noting that "Wood steals scenes as Ben, giving the comedic character punchlines that stick, as well as an unforeseen likeability", and judging that Chan "confidently treads a delicate line in one of the more complicated parts". Nugent also found Robins's script "tight and layered. On-stage action waxes and wanes but the mounting sense of dread is relentless" adding that he "is well-versed in what makes scary stories scarier, and uses that to brilliant effect here" and praising his "adept writing of emotionally charged two-handers, which provide a useful toehold into the characters’ psychological universe". She concluded, "Much more than simply a successful first foray into theatre for one British singer, 2:22 stands on its own merits. Bar a handful of genuinely terrifying moments, it's hardly The Exorcist, but maybe that's for the best. There are enough scary things happening in the world right now to keep us up at night".

Awards and nominations

External links 

 Official website

References 

2021 plays
British plays
West End plays
Thriller plays